"Guren"  is the 13th maxi-single by the Japanese rock band, The Gazette. It was released on February 13, 2008 in two editions; the "Optical Impression" edition, "Auditory Impression" edition. The first includes the songs "Guren" and "Kugutsue"- it also includes a DVD containing the music video for the song "Guren". The second comes with a bonus track, "Kyomu No Owari Hakozume No Mokuji".

Track listing

Guren: Optical Impression-
Disk one
 "Guren" (Crimson Lotus)- 5:24
 "Kugutsue" (Drawing of Puppet) - 4:39
Disc two (DVD)
 "Guren: Music Clip" – 5:52

Guren: Auditory Impression
 "Guren" (Crimson Lotus) - 5:24
 "Kugutsue" (Drawing of Puppet) - 4:39
 "Kyomu No Owari Hakodzume No Mokushi" – 4:36

Note
 The single reached a peak mark of #3 on the Japanese Oricon Weekly Charts.

References

2008 singles
The Gazette (band) songs
2008 songs
King Records (Japan) singles